See also Nabão (disambiguation) 
Nabao may refer to:
 Nabao region (Futuna Island, Vanuatu)
 Nabao (barangay) (Cabanatuan)